I Bet on Sky is the tenth studio album by the alternative rock band Dinosaur Jr. It was announced on June 13, 2012, and was released on September 17 in Europe and September 18 in the US. "Watch the Corners" was given a music video and promoted via a free mp3.

In 2012 it was awarded a silver certification from the Independent Music Companies Association, which indicated sales of at least 20,000 copies throughout Europe.

Critical reception
At Metacritic, which assigns a weighted average rating out of 100 to reviews from mainstream critics, I Bet on Sky has received an average score of 75, based on 33 reviews, indicating "generally favorable reviews".

Track listing 
All songs written by J Mascis except as noted.

Personnel
Dinosaur Jr.
J Mascis - guitar, vocals, keyboards, production
Lou Barlow - bass, vocals
Murph - drums
Technical
John Agnello - mixing, engineering
Greg Calbi - mastering
Amy Abrams - management
Brian Schwartz - management
Justin Pizzoferrato - engineering
Daniel Murphy - design
Travis Millard - artwork

References

2012 albums
Dinosaur Jr. albums